Grigory Constantinovich Petrov (1892-20 September 1918) was a Russian Left Socialist-Revolutionary activist in Baku, Azerbaijan, during the Russian Civil War. Petrov became one of the 26 Baku Commissars of the Soviet Commune that was established in the city after the October Revolution. He was the Military Commissar of the Baku region. When the Commune was toppled by the Centro Caspian Dictatorship, a British-backed coalition of Dashnaks, SRs and Mensheviks, Petrov and his comrades were captured by British troops and executed by a firing squad between the stations of Pereval and Akhcha-Kuyma of Transcaucasian Railroad on the night of 20 September 1918.

References 
 Журнальный зал | Новый Мир, 1997 N9 |  - «ЖМУ ВАШУ РУКУ, ДОРОГОЙ ТОВАРИЩ» at magazines.russ.ru

Left socialist-revolutionaries
Executed politicians
1892 births
1918 deaths
Soviet people of the Ukrainian–Soviet War
Articles containing video clips
Russian revolutionaries